The Modern pentathlon competition at the 2014 Central American and Caribbean Games was held in Veracruz, Mexico.

The tournament was scheduled to be held from 15–18 November at the Heriberto Jara Corona Stadium and Universidad Veracruzana.

Medal summary

Men's events

Women's events

Mixed events

Medal table

References

External links
Official Website

2014 Central American and Caribbean Games events
2014 in modern pentathlon
Central American and Caribbean Games
Qualification tournaments for the 2015 Pan American Games